Mongolia competed at the 2013 Summer Universiade in Kazan, Russia from 6 July to 17 July 2013. A total of 133 athletes made up the Mongolian team.

Mongolia won 25 medals, including 3 gold medals.

Medal summary

Medals by sport

Medalists

Boxing

Basketball

Judo

Sambo

Shooting

Wrestling

References

External links

Nations at the 2013 Summer Universiade
Mongolia at the Summer Universiade
2013 in Mongolian sport